I'm All Smiles is a live album by American jazz pianist Hampton Hawes recorded in 1966 but not released on the Contemporary label until 1973.

Reception
The Allmusic review by Ron Wynn states "His phrasing and voicings could entice or amaze, and he displays great range, rhythmic vitality, and harmonic excellence during the five selections featured on this 1966 live date".

Track listing
 "I'm All Smiles" (Michael Leonard, Herbert Martin) - 7:25 		
 "Manhã de Carnaval" (Luiz Bonfá, Antônio Maria) - 5:25 		
 "Spring Is Here" (Richard Rodgers, Lorenz Hart) - 5:04
 "The Shadow of Your Smile" (Johnny Mandel, Paul Francis Webster) - 9:55
 "Searchin'" (Hampton Hawes) - 10:22

Personnel
Hampton Hawes - piano
Red Mitchell - bass
Donald Bailey - drums

References

Contemporary Records live albums
Hampton Hawes live albums
1973 live albums